Erixon Michiel Arnolf Danso (born 22 July 1989) is an Aruban footballer who plays as a winger. He holds a Dutch passport.

Club career
Danso was born in Amsterdam, and has his roots in Aruba. He played for AFC Ajax's youth squad, and was signed professionally by FC Utrecht.

Danso made his debut for Utrecht against SC Heerenveen on 19 April 2009, and scored his first league goal for the club on 18 April 2010 in a 3–0 win against Sparta Rotterdam.

After spending time in the Spanish second division, Danso returned to Holland when he signed up for FC Dordrecht in summer 2013. He was released for indiscipline after a season, but was rehired after an injury to Giovanni Korte.

He returned to Holland to play for FC Emmen in the 2015/16 season, after a spell in Lebanon with Al Safa. In summer 2016, Danso left Emmen to join former coach Joop Gall at Ukrainian side Stal Kamianske In February 2017 he moved to Norway to play for second division FK Jerv after failing to score in 8 games for Stal.

Danso left Sandnes Ulf at the end of the 2018 season. On 27 January 2019, he signed with Egersunds IK in the Norwegian 2. divisjon.

International career

International goals
Scores and results list Aruba's goal tally first.

References

External links

 Voetbal International profile 
 

1989 births
Living people
Footballers from Amsterdam
Dutch people of Aruban descent
Association football wingers
Dutch footballers
Aruban footballers
Aruba international footballers
FC Utrecht players
Orihuela CF players
Valencia CF Mestalla footballers
FC Dordrecht players
Safa SC players
FC Emmen players
FC Stal Kamianske players
FK Jerv players
Sandnes Ulf players
Egersunds IK players
Norwegian Second Division players
Eredivisie players
Eerste Divisie players
Ukrainian Premier League players
Dutch expatriate footballers
Expatriate footballers in Spain
Expatriate footballers in Lebanon
Expatriate footballers in Ukraine
Expatriate footballers in Norway
Dutch expatriate sportspeople in Spain
Dutch expatriate sportspeople in Lebanon
Dutch expatriate sportspeople in Ukraine
Dutch expatriate sportspeople in Norway
Lebanese Premier League players